Louis Vincent Tomasetti  (January 8, 1916 – March 23, 2004) was an American football running back in the NFL from 1939 to 1942 and in the All-America Football Conference from 1946 to 1949. Tomasetti played college football at Bucknell University.

1916 births
2004 deaths
People from Old Forge, Lackawanna County, Pennsylvania
American people of Italian descent
Players of American football from Pennsylvania
American football running backs
Bucknell University alumni
Pittsburgh Pirates (football) players
Pittsburgh Steelers players
Detroit Lions players
Philadelphia Eagles players
Buffalo Bisons (AAFC) players
Buffalo Bills (AAFC) players